Druzhba is a rural locality (a settlement) in Korobitsynskoye Rural Settlement, Syamzhensky District, Vologda Oblast, Russia. The population was 111 as of 2002. There are 3 streets.

Geography 
Druzhba is located 62 km southeast of Syamzha (the district's administrative centre) by road.

References 

Rural localities in Syamzhensky District